Aristotelis Mistakidis (born 1962) is a Swiss-based Greek metals trader who became a billionaire working for Glencore. He has joint Greek/British citizenship.

Early life
Aristotelis Mistakidis was born in Rome, Italy, where his marine biologist father worked for the United Nations. He was educated at the London School of Economics.

Career
Mistakidis worked for six years trading in non-ferrous metals for Cargill. In 1993, he joined Marc Rich & Co in 1993, shortly before there was a management buyout and it was renamed Glencore. He worked in the zinc, copper and lead department, rising to become a co-director in 2000. He became a billionaire with the May 2011 Glencore IPO. He owned 3% stake of Glencore.

Mistakidis is a director of Mopani Copper Mines Limited, Portovesme SRL, and  SA, and a non-executive director of Katanga Mining and Xstrata plc.

In December 2018, Mistakidis retired as Glencore's head of copper marketing.

During 2021, Mistakidis along with US billionaire John Paulson invested in Greece's second largest bank Piraeus Bank. He holds a 5.14% stake in the bank, Mistakidis highlighted his confidence in the Greek national economy in the investment worth 31 million euros.

The Sunday Times Rich List 2022. reports Mistakidis net worth being £2.153 billion.

Personal life
Mistakidis is married, with one child, and lives in Zug, Switzerland.

In 2015, Mistakidis purchased a duplex flat for over £46 million in Chesham Place, Belgravia, London, designed by  Christian and Nick Candy, then one of the most expensive properties ever sold in the UK.

References

Living people
1962 births
Glencore people
Greek billionaires
Greek commodities traders
People named in the Paradise Papers